Pushkar is a town in the Indian state of Rajasthan. It may also refer to
Pushkar Fair in Pushkar
Pushkar railway station in Pushkar
Pushkar Lake near Pushkar
Brahma Temple, Pushkar
Pushkar (name)